North Motherwell is an area of Motherwell, North Lanarkshire, Scotland. It is the closest neighbourhood of the town to Strathclyde Country Park. Despite its name, North Motherwell actually lies in the south west of the town.

The area consists of mainly detached or semi-detached housing. There are five main roads situated in North Motherwell: The Loaning, Birrens Road, Watling Street, Fort Street and Logans Road, that lead to the main roads into Motherwell and beyond. These three roads are where virtually all of North Motherwell's local services are located. Services include a post office, convenience store and a bar.

The West Coast Main Line by-passes to the north of the neighbourhood, and there is Motherwell railway station which serves Motherwell in North Lanarkshire, Scotland. It lies on the West Coast Main Line (WCML), and is served also by Argyle Line trains of the Glasgow suburban railway network. It is the penultimate stop on the northbound WCML before Glasgow. There are four platforms of various length in use at Motherwell. The station is located next to the town's main shopping arcade, Motherwell Shopping Centre. https://en.wikipedia.org/wiki/Motherwell_railway_station. There are also pathways along the western part of North Motherwell leading into Strathclyde Country Park.

External links
Community: North Motherwell
Motherwell railway station
Motherwell
Neighbourhoods in North Lanarkshire